Roches-lès-Blamont (literally Roches near Blamont) is a commune in the Doubs Department in the Bourgogne-Franche-Comté region in eastern France.

Geography

Population

See also
 Blamont
 Communes of the Doubs department

References

External links

 Roches-lès-Blamont on the regional Web site 

Communes of Doubs